The 2012–13 season was East Bengal F.C.'s 93rd season since their formation in 1920 and their sixteenth season ever in the I-League which is India's top football league. At the end of the season the club had won the Federation Cup, finished 3rd in the 2012–13 I-League, and made it to the quarter-finals of the 2013 AFC Cup.

Transfers

In:

Out:

Note: Flags indicate national team as has been defined under FIFA eligibility rules. Players may hold more than one non-FIFA nationality.

Squad

First-team squad

Out on loan

Kit
Sponsors: Kingfisher Premium / Co-Sponsor: Rose-Valley

Competitions

Overall

Overview

Calcutta Football League

Table
Group A

Championship Stage

Fixtures & results

First stage

Championship Stage

Federation Cup

Group C

Summary
East Bengal entered the 2012 Indian Federation Cup automatically as they were already in the I-League. They were placed in Group C along with Sporting Clube de Goa, ONGC, and Kalighat MS and their matches were played in Siliguri. East Bengal experienced mixed fortunes at the start of the tournament as they drew their opening match 1–1 against Sporting Goa with new Nigerian signing Chidi Edeh scoring his first goal for the club in the 10th minute from the penalty spot. The club then won their first game of the season in their second match of the tournament on 23 September 2012 against ONGC F.C. in which East Bengal came back from 0–1 down to 2–1 winners after Edeh and other new signing, India international, Manandeep Singh scored two goals to gift Bengal the victory. East Bengal then confirmed promotion out of the group stage of the Federation Cup to the Semi-Finals after a remarkable come from behind victory in their last game at the group stage to Kalighat MS in which East Bengal came back from 2–0 to tie the score up at 2–2 through two goals from Manandeep Singh in the 26th and 30th minute but then East Bengal had to come from behind again after Kalighat took the lead again to go up 3–2 with Edeh scoring two goals to win the game for East Bengal 4–3 and send them to the semi-finals. In the semi-finals East Bengal took on Churchill Brothers and after finishing regulation time tied at 0–0 the match went into 30-minute extra-time where East Bengal would eventually take the lead from former Churchill Brothers youngster Lalrindika Ralte in the 111th minute of play which then allowed East Bengal to win the match 1–0 and send them to the final. Then in the final East Bengal found themselves down 1–0 after 51 minutes after their opponents, Dempo, scored through former India captain Climax Lawrence but East Bengal managed to equalize through newly signed defender Arnab Mondal in the 60th minute which would then send both clubs to 30-minute extra-time at 1–1 and that is where East Bengal start to show good form by scoring twice through Manandeep Singh in the 100th minute and Chidi Edeh in the 109th minute to give East Bengal a 3–1 lead which would then be cut down to a 3–2 after another former India international, Mahesh Gawli scored in the 111th minute but that was still enough for East Bengal to win the Federation Cup for the 2nd time in 3 years and their eighth overall.

Fixtures & results

I-League

Table

Fixtures & results

IFA Shield

Group A

Fixtures & results

AFC Cup

Due to East Bengal's 2012 Indian Federation Cup victory the club automatically qualified for the 2013 AFC Cup which is the 2nd tier Asian competition ran by the Asian Football Confederation. On 6 December 2012 the AFC made their official 2013 AFC Cup group-stage draw and East Bengal was placed in Group H along with reigning 2012 S.League champions Tampines Rovers of Singapore, Malaysia Super League third place team Selangor FA, and V-League third place team Saigon Xuan Thanh.

Table
Group H

Fixtures & results

Statistics

Appearances 
Players with no appearances are not included in the list.

Goal scorers

References

East
East Bengal Club seasons